Love Shot may refer to:

 Love Shot (Exo album), a repackage of Don't Mess Up My Tempo, 2018
 "Love Shot" (Exo song), the title song
 Love Shot, a 1983 album by Hot Chocolate
 Love Shot, a 2010 album by the Blue Van
 "Love Shot", a 1999 song by Mandy Moore from So Real
 Love Shot, a 2018 film featuring John Kapelos

See also
Shot of Love, a 1981 album by Bob Dylan